Kushmiita Parmjeet Kaur Parmar (born 1970) is a New Zealand politician who was elected to the New Zealand parliament at the 2014 general election as a representative of the New Zealand National Party and became the first Indian-born woman to become a Member of the New Zealand Parliament. She was appointed as the Opposition Spokesperson for Research, Science and Innovation from 3 November 2017, and Statistics on 16 July 2020 and Opposition Associate Spokesperson for Economic Development on 12 March 2018.  She was made the Chairperson of the Education and Workforce Select Committee in her second term from 14 May 2018 to until the end of that term and the Deputy Chairperson of the Transport and Industrial Relations Select Committee in her first term.

Early life
Parmar grew up in India where her father served in the Indian Air Force. She completed a masters in biochemistry in India and in 1995 moved to New Zealand to join her husband. At the University of Auckland, she gained a PhD in neuroscience and the title of her 2003 doctoral thesis was Neuroserpin regulates neurite outgrowth in AtT-20 and PC12 cell lines. She then worked as a scientist. In 2007, Parmar and her husband became directors of confectionery company, Kiwi Empire Confectionery Limited. She also worked as a current affairs and talkback host on Radio Tarana, and accompanied former prime ministers Helen Clark and John Key on their official visits to India as a member of the press. The National Party appointed her to the board of the-then Families Commission in 2013. She entered Parliament as a National list MP in 2014.

Political career

In early 2014, Parmar was photographed wearing a National Party ribbon with John Key at an Auckland event. This led Labour MP Rajen Prasad to question whether it was appropriate for Parmar to remain as a commissioner for the Families Commission, fuelled also by rumours of Parmar's potential of running as a candidate for the 2014 general election.

Parmar contested the Mount Roskill electorate at the 2014 election and came second place after Labour's candidate Phil Goff. Ranked at 48 on National's party list, she was elected as a list MP. National, however, won the party vote in the electorate for the first time since the seat's formation.

During the 2016 by-election and 2017 election, she again contested the seat of Mount Roskill, coming second to Labour's Michael Wood, and was re-elected as a list MP.

First term 
As a former Families Commissioner, she was a Member of the Social Services Select Committee.

Parmar was made the Deputy Chairperson of the Transport and Industrial Relations Select Committee later in the Parliamentary term. She campaigned for bus stops to be sheltered, with the goal of making public transport more accessible to the elderly. Parmar also campaigned on improving public transport in the community and for more modes of transport to be made available in Mt Roskill.

Parmar’s Member’s Bill entitled the "Newborn Enrolment with General Practice Bill", was drawn and introduced in the House on 11 May 2017. The Bill, which proposed to require newborns to be enrolled with a general practice before the age of 6 months, passed its first reading and was referred to the Health Select Committee.

Second term 
Following the 2017 election, Parmar was appointed as the Shadow Minister for Research, Science and Innovation and Associate Shadow Minister for Economic Development and later as the Shadow Minister for Statistics.

Parmar served as a member for the Economic Development, Science and Innovation Select Committee until she was made the Chairperson of the Education and Workforce Select Committee.

She continued her campaign for local improvements of roads in Mt Roskill, and successfully campaigned for an accident-prone intersection to be converted to a roundabout.

Her Member's Bill "Newborn Enrolment with General Practice Bill" was reported back from the Select Committee in May 2018 and came before the House for a second reading, however was unsuccessful in progressing to a third reading, after the Labour-led Coalition Government pulled their support for the Bill.

Parmar drafted a second Member's Bill entitled the "Patents (Advancement Patents) Amendment Bill" which proposed to create a second-tier patent with lesser eligibility requirements and protection compared to the standard patent. Parmar's bill was drawn from the ballot in April 2018 and subsequently attracted attention from local patent attorneys, the software industry, and from overseas jurisdictions. The Bill was ultimately unsuccessful at its first reading, as the Government did not support the Bill.

Parmar worked with a Mt Roskill local amenity, Stardome Observatory, to help fix an issue that all Auckland Regional Amenities faced in regards to their financial reporting requirements. Parmar sponsored a Private Bill entitled the "Auckland Regional Amenities Funding Amendment Bill" and successfully gained the unanimous support of the House. The Bill received Royal Assent on 2 July 2020.

As a member of various inter-parliamentary associations during her second term she attended and spoke at national and international conferences including:

 25th Annual Meeting of the Asia-Pacific Parliamentary Forum in Nadi, Fiji, from 15 to 19 January 2017. Parmar presented on developing regional and sub-regional strategies on combating non-communicable diseases.
 Annual Westminster Seminar hosted by CPA United Kingdom at the British Houses of Parliament, 2019. Parmar presented as part of a session on "Pressures on Parliamentarians".
 As a member of the Commonwealth Women Parliamentarians, Parmar as the Chairperson of a Select Committee hosted a delegation of women Members of Parliament of the Republic of Fiji for a workshop.

In response to comments by New Zealand First MP Shane Jones in which he stated that immigrants that criticised immigration policies should 'catch the first plane home', Parmar sent a letter to Prime Minister Jacinda Ardern expressing her concerns. On the 150th anniversary of Mahatma Gandhi's birth, Parmar ran a petition for his statute to be installed in Auckland to acknowledge his legacy.  At the time of launching her petition, she said "that a statue of Mahatma Gandhi is not just about India and New Zealand, and/or Indians in New Zealand, it is about honouring his legacy – the legacy that is ever lasting and is influencing civilised societies all around the world."

As shadow minister for Research, Science and Innovation, Parmar advocated for more certainty of funding for fire research in light of Port Hills and Nelson fires and financial security for Crown Research Institutes. Parmar also successfully advocated for scientific start-up companies not making any revenue to qualify for the wage-subsidy scheme that the Government had announced to help businesses during COVID-19 pandemic, as the criteria were such that start-up scientific sector didn't initially qualify. Furthermore, she advocated for funding to be awarded to the local scientific sector to invest in researching a COVID-19 vaccine.

Parmar stood against changes at the Massey University’s Albany campus that would result in a loss of scientific jobs and opportunity for local students to study science degree at the Albany campus.

Parmar has advocated for change to legislation that governs biotechnology and genetic modification in New Zealand. She believes that biotech is one of the strongest tools that can help New Zealand reduce its greenhouse gas emissions, and that New Zealand must change its legislation if it is serious about its climate change aspirations.

During the 2020 general election, Parmar again contested the Mount Roskill electorate and due to a significant swing towards the Labour Party was not able to return as a list MP.

Parmar has continued to remain active in the media.

References

External links
Profile at National party
Profile on Parliamentary website

1970 births
Living people
New Zealand National Party MPs
Members of the New Zealand House of Representatives
Women members of the New Zealand House of Representatives
New Zealand list MPs
21st-century New Zealand politicians
21st-century New Zealand women politicians
Savitribai Phule Pune University alumni
Indian emigrants to New Zealand
Candidates in the 2017 New Zealand general election
Unsuccessful candidates in the 2020 New Zealand general election
Politicians of Indian descent
University of Auckland alumni